Toft Monks Priory was a priory at Toft Monks, Beccles, Norfolk, England. It included St Margarets, Toft Monks and St Mary, Haddiscoe

Revenues from the "manor of Toft, with the tithe of 'Cerlentone' and 'Posteberies,' and the churches of those two towns" were given to Préaux Abbey, in Les Préaux, Normandy in 1099 by Robert of Meulan, later the first Earl of Leicester.

References

"Alien houses: The priory of Toft Monks" in A History of the County of Norfolk: Volume 2. Ed. William Page. London: Victoria County History, 1906. pp. 464–465. British History Online. accessed 31 October 2019.

Monasteries in Norfolk